Hajji Kandi and Haji Kandi may refer to:
 Hajji Kandi, East Azerbaijan
 Hajji Kandi-ye Olya, East Azerbaijan Province
 Hajji Kandi-ye Sofla, East Azerbaijan Province
 Hajji Kandi, West Azerbaijan
 Hajji Kandi, Bukan, West Azerbaijan Province
 Hajji Kandi, Zanjan